Antoine Duane Winfield Jr. (born August 16, 1998) is an American football free safety for the Tampa Bay Buccaneers of the National Football League (NFL). He played college football at Minnesota, and was drafted by the Buccaneers in the second round of the 2020 NFL Draft. He is the son of former NFL player Antoine Winfield Sr.

Early years
Winfield Jr. attended Eden Prairie High School in Eden Prairie, Minnesota for his freshman year before he and his family moved to The Woodlands, Texas and attended The Woodlands High School, where he was a three-year letterer and two-year starting safety, in addition to being the team's kick returner alongside future NFL player Patrick Carr. As a senior, he totaled 87 tackles, five forced fumbles, and one interception, and was named the Montgomery County Player of the Year. Winfield was considered a two-star recruit by Rivals.com, and accepted a scholarship from Minnesota over offers from Baylor, Eastern Michigan, Houston, Lamar, Missouri, South Florida, Texas State, and Wyoming, among others.

College career
As a true freshman at Minnesota in 2016, Winfield Jr. played in 12 games and made nine starts. During the season, he had 52 tackles, one interception and one fumble recovered for a touchdown. He played in the first four games in 2017 before suffering an injury that caused him to miss the rest of the season. He finished the season with 20 tackles and a sack. Winfield Jr. again played in only four games in 2018, recording 17 tackles and an interception. He returned from the injuries in 2019 and was named a finalist for the Bronko Nagurski Trophy. In the 2019 season, his seven receptions led the Big Ten. After being named a first-team All American and Big Ten Defensive Back of the Year during the 2019 season, Winfield announced that he would forgo his final two years of eligibility and declared for the 2020 NFL Draft.

Collegiate statistics

Professional career

2020 season
Winfield was selected by the Tampa Bay Buccaneers with the 45th overall pick in the second round of the 2020 NFL Draft. On July 29, 2020, Winfield signed his four-year rookie contract, worth $7.3 million, including a $2.87 million signing bonus.

He made his regular season debut in Week 1 during a 34–23 loss to the New Orleans Saints, recording six tackles and a pass deflection. In Week 2, during a 31–17 win against the Carolina Panthers, Winfield recorded 11 total tackles and his first career sack, which resulted in a fumble. Winfield was named the NFL Defensive Rookie of the Month for his performance in September (23 total tackles, two pass deflections, two sacks, and a forced fumble from Weeks 1–3). In Week 7, during a 45–20 win against the Las Vegas Raiders, Winfield recorded two tackles, a pass deflection, and his first career interception. In Week 14 against the Minnesota Vikings, Winfield led the team with 12 tackles and sacked Kirk Cousins once during a 26–14 win. In Week 17 against the Atlanta Falcons, Winfield recorded seven total tackles, one pass deflection, and recovered a fumble in a 44–27 win. He was named to the PFWA All-Rookie Team.

Winfield finished the 2020 regular season with 94 total tackles, three sacks, six pass deflections, one interception, two forced fumbles, and one fumble recovery.

2020 postseason
In the Wild Card Round of the 2020–21 NFL playoffs against the Washington Football Team, Winfield recorded six total tackles in a 31–23 win. In the Divisional Round against the New Orleans Saints, Winfield recorded six total tackles as well as forced a fumble on tight end Jared Cook that was recovered by teammate Devin White during the 30–20 win. Winfield injured his ankle during practice in the week leading up to the NFC Championship against the Green Bay Packers and was forced to miss the game; however, the Buccaneers defeated the Packers 31–26 to advance. Winfield was fit enough to start Super Bowl LV, where he recorded six tackles and intercepted a pass thrown by Patrick Mahomes in the 31–9 victory over the Kansas City Chiefs. Winfield covered Chiefs wide receiver Tyreek Hill on two targets, recording a pass breakup and an interception on both targets, allowing a 0.0 passer rating. Winfield also garnered attention when near the end of the game he taunted Hill using Hill's signature peace sign celebration after a fourth down incompletion, drawing an unsportsmanlike conduct penalty. Winfield's taunt was reportedly in retaliation for the Week 12 regular season game where the Chiefs defeated the Buccaneers 27-24 in Tampa Bay, where Hill flashed the peace sign after beating Winfield for a touchdown and also for Hill's backflip celebration after scoring another touchdown.

2021 season
Winfield finished the 2021 regular season with 88 combined tackles (62 solo), two sacks, six deflections, two interceptions, two forced fumbles, and three fumble recoveries in 13 games and starts.

2021 postseason
In the Wild Card Round of the 2021–22 NFL playoffs against the Philadelphia Eagles, Winfield recorded five total tackles and one sack as the Buccaneers won 31–15. In the Divisional Round against the Los Angeles Rams, Winfield recorded nine total tackles as well as forced a fumble on Rams running back Cam Akers which Winfield himself recovered near the Buccaneers own goal line at the end of the 1st half, but gave up a key 44–yard reception to Rams wide receiver Cooper Kupp late in the fourth quarter which put Rams kicker Matt Gay in range to convert a game winning 30–yard field goal, as the Rams defeated the Buccaneers 30–27 to eliminate them from the playoffs and end their season.

On January 26, 2022, Winfield earned his first career Pro Bowl selection after being named as an injury replacement for Seattle Seahawks safety Quandre Diggs. He was ranked 75th by his fellow players on the NFL Top 100 Players of 2022.

NFL career statistics

Regular season

Postseason

Personal life
Winfield's father, Antoine Sr., played in the NFL for 14 seasons with the Buffalo Bills and the Minnesota Vikings. Antoine Jr., was born in Columbus, Ohio while his father attended Ohio State University. His mother Erniece Winfield also attended Ohio State.

References

External links

Tampa Bay Buccaneers bio
Minnesota Golden Gophers bio

1998 births
Living people
People from The Woodlands, Texas
Players of American football from Texas
Sportspeople from Harris County, Texas
American football safeties
Minnesota Golden Gophers football players
All-American college football players
Tampa Bay Buccaneers players